Curimatella dorsalis is a species of toothless characins from South America (Orinoco, Amazon, Tocantins, and Paraguay-lower Paraná River basins).

References 

 Curimatella dorsalis at fishbase

Curimatidae
Taxa named by Rosa Smith Eigenmann
Taxa named by Carl H. Eigenmann
Fish described in 1889
Fish of South America
Fish of Brazil
Fauna of Paraguay